Ghazal El Jobeili (born April 8, 1986) is a Lebanese former swimmer, who specialized in sprint freestyle events. El Jobeili qualified for the women's 50 m freestyle at the 2004 Summer Olympics in Athens, by receiving a Universality place from FINA, in an entry time of 31.42. She challenged six other swimmers in heat two, including 14-year-olds Sameera Al-Bitar of Bahrain and Christal Clashing of Antigua and Barbuda. She tied for first place with Al-Bitar in their personal bests of exactly 30 seconds. El Jobeili failed to advance into the semifinals, as she placed sixty-third overall out of 75 swimmers on the last day of preliminaries.

References

1986 births
Living people
Lebanese female swimmers
Olympic swimmers of Lebanon
Swimmers at the 2004 Summer Olympics
Lebanese female freestyle swimmers
Sportspeople from Beirut
21st-century Lebanese women